Joseph W. Hoyt (May 18, 1840July 8, 1902) was an American merchant and Republican politician.  He was a member of the Wisconsin State Senate (1885 & 1887) and State Assembly (1871), representing Vernon County.

Biography

Born in Craftsbury, Vermont, Hoyt served in the 1st Vermont Cavalry during the American Civil War. In 1863, he settled in Chaseburg, Wisconsin, and was a merchant and lumber dealer. He served on the town board, and then, on the Vernon County, Wisconsin Board of Supervisors. He was chairman of the county board. Hoyt served in the Wisconsin State Assembly in 1871 as a Republican and then in the Wisconsin State Senate during the 1885 and 1887 sessions. Hoyt died at his home in Chaseburg, Wisconsin.

Electoral history

Wisconsin Assembly (1870)

| colspan="6" style="text-align:center;background-color: #e9e9e9;"| General Election, November 8, 1870

Wisconsin Senate (1884)

| colspan="6" style="text-align:center;background-color: #e9e9e9;"| General Election, November 8, 1884

References

1840 births
1902 deaths
People from Craftsbury, Vermont
People from Vernon County, Wisconsin
People of Vermont in the American Civil War
Businesspeople from Wisconsin
County supervisors in Wisconsin
Wisconsin city council members
Republican Party Wisconsin state senators
19th-century American politicians
19th-century American businesspeople
Republican Party members of the Wisconsin State Assembly